The escudo was the currency of São Tomé and Príncipe between 1914 and 1977. It was equivalent to the Portuguese escudo and subdivided into 100 centavos.

History
The escudo replaced the real at a rate of 1000 réis = 1 escudo. Initially, only banknotes were issued in the name of São Tomé and Príncipe and the colony used Portuguese coins. Only in 1929 were coins also issued for the colony. The escudo was replaced at par by the dobra following independence.

Coins
In 1929, nickel-bronze 10, 20 and 50 centavos coins were introduced. These were followed in 1939 by cupro-nickel 1 escudo and silver , 5 and 10 escudos. Bronze 10, 20 and 50 centavos and 1 escudo, and cupro-nickel  escudos were introduced in 1962, followed, in 1971, by aluminium 10 centavos and cupro-nickel 5, 10 and 20 escudos. This was the last year of coin production.

Banknotes
In 1914, the Banco National Ultramarino introduced notes for 10, 20 and 50 centavos, followed by 5 centavos notes in 1918. In 1921, larger denominations of 1, 5, 10, 20, 50 and 100 escudos were introduced. 500 escudos were introduced in 1956, followed by 1000 escudos in 1964.

Between 1974 and 1976, the Banco Nacional de São Tomé e Príncipe issued bearer cheques for circulation in denominations of 100, 500 and 1000 escudos. In 1976, the Banco Nacional also issued notes of the Banco National Ultramarino, overprinted with the new bank's name, in denominations of 20, 50, 100, 500 and 1000 escudos.

References

Currencies of Portugal
Modern obsolete currencies
Currencies of São Tomé and Príncipe
Economic history of Portugal
1914 establishments in the Portuguese Empire
1977 disestablishments
History of São Tomé and Príncipe
Portuguese São Tomé and Príncipe
Escudo